The Czechoslovakian Grand Prix (Czech: Velká cena Československa; Slovak: Československá Grand Prix) was a Grand Prix motor racing event held in 1949 at the Masaryk Circuit now referred to as the Brno Circuit. It was held in the town of Brno in Czechoslovakia (now the Czech Republic).

The Masaryk circuit race was first held on September 28, 1930. From 1934 onwards, the race was dominated by the German Silver Arrows. In 1937, several spectators were killed or injured when Hermann Lang skidded off the track. The spectators had been in a prohibited area but Lang was sued anyway.

The 1949 Czechoslovakian Grand Prix, part of the world Grand Prix motor racing, raced in the opposite direction than the pre-war races, drew a crowd in excess of 400,000 people. However, this would be the last Czechoslovakian Grand Prix. 

27 years later a Czechoslovak Race was held at the same venue as a round of the European Touring Car Championship. BMW dominated for six years through various models before Jaguar asserted their own dominance. The race became part of the one-off 1987 World Touring Car Championship, but at a new venue, the newly constructed Brno Circuit. The race was won by the Swiss-based factory Ford team. A final race was held the following year as part of the World Sportscar Championship. The Sauber-Mercedes of Jochen Mass and Jean-Louis Schlesser prevented the Tom Walkinshaw team from claiming a fourth win for Jaguar.

Winners of the Czechoslovakian Championships

External links
 Map of Masaryk Circuit from 1930 to 1937
 Full results of GP class event of III Masaryk Circuit in 1932
 Results and report about GP class event of IV Masaryk Circuit in 1933
 Results and report about International race of automobiles at Masaryk Circuit in 1934 (GP class and voiturette class events)
 Results and report about Masaryk Grand Prix in 1935 (GP class and voiturette class events)
 Results and report about Masaryk Grand Prix (GP class event) and GP de la Ville de Brno (voiturette class event) in 1937
 Results and report about Grand Prix ČSSR in 1988

Pre-World Championship Grands Prix
Motorsport in Czechoslovakia
National Grands Prix
Grand Prix
Recurring sporting events established in 1930
Recurring sporting events disestablished in 1988
Touring car races
Sports car races
1930 establishments in Czechoslovakia
1988 disestablishments in Czechoslovakia